Mina® is an album by Italian singer Mina, distributed back to back with album Baby Gate.

Some of the songs of this album were recorded in different languages by Mina during the 1970s. In 
1975, she recorded "Due o forse tre", "Nuur" and "Distanze" in Spanish ("Dos o acaso tres", "Nuur", " Dostancias"), as well "Tutto passerà vedrai" ("Todo pasara veras"). The same first three songs were covered in French one year later (as "Deux peut-être trois", "Lumière", "Ensemble"), as well "Caravel" ("La chiromancienne") and "Solo lui" ("Rien que vous"). All the tracks were published on albums for French and Spanish-speaking countries only and were re-issued on cd by EMI in 2011 (in the unofficial album compilations Je suis Mina and Yo soy Mina).

Track listing

Credits
Mina – vocals
Pino Presti – arranger/conductor
Gianni Ferrio – arranger/conductor in "Penombra" and "Trasparenze"
Vince Tempera – arranger/conductor in "Caravel"
Toto Torquati – arranger/conductor in "Mai prima" and "Solo lui"
Nuccio Rinaldis – sound engineer

1974 albums
Mina (Italian singer) albums
Albums conducted by Pino Presti
Albums arranged by Pino Presti
Italian-language albums